Orlando Bianchini (born 4 June 1955 in Guidonia, Roma) is a retired male hammer thrower from Italy, that won a medal at the Mediterranean Games (1983).

Biography
Orlando Bianchini participated at one edition of the Summer Olympics (1984), he has 34 caps in national team from 1975 to 1987.

Achievements

National titles
Orlando Bianchini has won 2 times the individual national championship.
1 win in Hammer throw (1985)
1 win in hammer throw at the Italian Winter Throwing Championships (1984)

See also
 Italian all-time lists - Hammer throw

References

External links
 

1955 births
Living people
Italian male hammer throwers
Athletes (track and field) at the 1984 Summer Olympics
Olympic athletes of Italy
Mediterranean Games silver medalists for Italy
Athletes (track and field) at the 1983 Mediterranean Games
Mediterranean Games medalists in athletics
20th-century Italian people
21st-century Italian people